Nicolae Comănescu (born November 14, 1968) is a Romanian painter. Described as one of the country's best-known artists of the present day, he had a solo exhibition at the National Museum of Contemporary Art in the autumn of 2011.

Notes

Living people
1968 births
People from Pitești
Romanian painters